Hayley Wolff  (born 1964) is an American freestyle skier.

She won a gold medal in moguls at the FIS Freestyle World Ski Championships 1983 in Breckenridge and 
she won a silver medal in moguls at the FIS Freestyle World Ski Championships 1986 in Tignes.

References

External links 
 

1964 births
Living people
American female freestyle skiers
21st-century American women